Yellidzha may refer to:
 Bayburd, Armenia
 Yellicə, Azerbaijan